is a train station in Satsumasendai, Kagoshima Prefecture, Japan. It is served by the third sector Hisatsu Orange Railway that follows the former coastal route of the JR Kyushu Kagoshima Main Line connecting Yatsushiro and Sendai.

Station layout 
The station consists of two platforms at street level.

Adjacent stations

Gallery

See also 
 List of railway stations in Japan

References

External links 	
 	
  	
 

Stations of Hisatsu Orange Railway
Railway stations in Japan opened in 1922